Knyk is a municipality and village in Havlíčkův Brod District in the Vysočina Region of the Czech Republic. It has about 400 inhabitants.

Administrative parts
The village of Rozňák is an administrative part of Knyk.

References

Villages in Havlíčkův Brod District